Laina Pérez (born 27 October 1988) is a Cuban sport shooter. In 2019, she won the gold medal in the women's 10 metres air pistol event at the 2019 Pan American Games held in Lima, Peru. She also won the gold medal in the mixed 10 metres air pistol event together with Jorge Grau.

At the 2018 Shooting Championships of the Americas held in Guadalajara, Mexico, she won the silver medal in the women's 25 metres pistol event.

She competed at the 2020 Summer Olympics held in Tokyo, Japan.

References

External links 
 

Living people
1988 births
Sportspeople from Matanzas
Cuban female sport shooters
Pan American Games medalists in shooting
Pan American Games gold medalists for Cuba
Medalists at the 2019 Pan American Games
Shooters at the 2019 Pan American Games
Central American and Caribbean Games gold medalists for Cuba
Central American and Caribbean Games silver medalists for Cuba
Central American and Caribbean Games medalists in shooting
Competitors at the 2018 Central American and Caribbean Games
Shooters at the 2020 Summer Olympics
Olympic shooters of Cuba
20th-century Cuban women
21st-century Cuban women